Anders Christian Sjaastad (born 21 February 1942) is a Norwegian politician for the Conservative Party, and a parliamentary representative for Oslo from 1993–1997. He was Minister of Defense from 1981–1986.

References

1942 births
Living people
Members of the Storting
Conservative Party (Norway) politicians
20th-century Norwegian politicians
Defence ministers of Norway